Giacomo Filippo Fransoni (10 December 1775 – 20 April 1856) was an Italian prelate and  cardinal who served from 1834 to 1856 as prefect of the Sacred Congregation for the Propagation of the Faith. He was the cardinal priest of the Church of San Lorenzo in Lucina at the time of his death.

Life
Born in Genoa, Fransoni was ordained a priest on 14 March 1807, at 31 years of age, by Cardinal Pietro Francesco Galeffi. On 7 September 1822, he was appointed Titular Archbishop of Nazianzus and ordained to the episcopate three months later. On 21 January 1823, aged 47, he was appointed Apostolic Nuncio to Portugal. On 2 October 1826, aged 50, he was elevated to the cardinalate and named cardinal priest of the Basilica of Santa Maria in Aracoeli.

On 21 November 1834, Fransoni was appointed prefect of the Sacred Congregation for the Propagation of the Faith in the Curia. On 28 September 1855, aged almost 80, his titular church was changed to that of the Church of San Lorenzo in Lucina.
 
Fransoni died on 20 April 1856, aged 80. He had been a priest for 49 years, a bishop for 33 and a cardinal for almost 30.

Fransoni is in the episcopal lineage of Pope Francis. Among those whom he ordained as priests was the English convert, John Henry Newman, Cong.Orat.

References

1775 births
1856 deaths
Clergy from Genoa
19th-century Italian Roman Catholic titular archbishops
Apostolic Nuncios to Portugal
19th-century Italian cardinals
Members of the Congregation for the Propagation of the Faith